Chah Talkhab-e Olya (also Romanized as Chāh Talkhāb-e ‘Olyā; also known as Chāh Talkhāb-e Bālā, Chāh Talkh-e Bar Āftāb, and Chāh Talkh-e Bār Āftāb) is a village in Babuyi Rural District, Basht District, Basht County, Kohgiluyeh and Boyer-Ahmad Province, Iran. At the 2016 census, its population was 369, in 100 families

References 

Populated places in Basht County